Oglethorpe Barracks usually refers to a 19th-century United States Army post in the historic district of Savannah, Georgia.  Some sources use the title to refer to Fort James Jackson (also known as Fort Oglethorpe) or Fort Wayne, both near Savannah.  A hotel constructed in the 1880s now sits on the site of the old barracks.

Origin
In 1823, City of Savannah, Georgia, petitioned Secretary of War John C. Calhoun to build a military barracks within the city and agreed to purchase the necessary land.  The War Department agreed to the endeavor and furnished the materials to build the barracks.  Troops arrived in the mid to late 1820s to construct the facility.  The barracks took the name of James Oglethorpe, founder of Georgia colony and of the settlement of Savannah.

Antebellum period
The post surgeon took meteorological observations probably as early as 1827.  Construction of Oglethorpe Barracks finished circa 1834.  The weather station began using a rain gauge in 1836.  

Meteorological observations continued through December 1850; American soldiers probably left the post at the end of the year.  In 1852, City of Savannah proposed to purchase the site from the War Department, and the War Department sold the parcel to the City in 1853.

Civil War
Local Confederate volunteer companies occupied Oglethorpe Barracks throughout American Civil War until Union General William Tecumseh Sherman captured the city in 1864.

Reconstruction era
United States Army troops continued to occupy Fort Oglethorpe after the end of the Civil War.  Meteorological observations resumed in or before September 1866.  

The buildings on the post surrounded a courtyard that functioned as its parade ground. A two-story brick building abutted Harris Street west of the hospital.  

During the long summer of 1876, the troops transferred to Camp Oglethorpe near Oliver, Georgia.

Decommissioning
The Army left Oglethorpe Barracks after March 1879, when meteorological observations ceased.  The Signal Service office in Savannah continued the record of meteorological observations for the city at another location.  The War Department later in 1879 sold the parcel to Savannah Hotel Corporation for $75,000.  Congress in 1883 directed Secretary of War Robert Todd Lincoln to sell Oglethorpe Barracks.  

The new owner then tore down the barracks.  Construction of Desoto Hotel on the site of the former barracks began in 1888 and completed in 1890.  The hotel featured five stories, 206 rooms, a solarium, a barber shop, a drug store, and a restaurant; a swimming pool (outdoor) was added later.  A fountain featuring the head of a lion with water flowing out its mouth was a feature of the hotel, which remain today. For a number of years, a local radio station WCCP, later WBYG, had studios in the hotel.  Hilton now operates the hotel.  

The Army closed Fort James Jackson in 1902.  

The parcel on which Oglethorpe Barracks once stood now lies just northeast of Madison Square in historic old Savannah.

References
Grice, Garry, 2005: History of Weather Observations, Oglethorpe Barracks, Georgia, 1827-1879. Midwestern Regional Climate Center, 15 pp.

Forts in Georgia (U.S. state)
Meteorological stations
Military facilities in Savannah, Georgia
Hotel buildings completed in 1890